Adam Jonathan Gee (born 12 September 1963 in London, England) is a London-based interactive media and TV producer and commissioner. Prominent interactive productions and commissions include MindGym, Embarrassing Bodies multiplatform, Big Art Mob, Big Fish Fight and Don't Stop the Music multiplatform. Prominent video productions include Missed Call and They Saw The Sun First.

He is currently Commissioning Editor at Little Dot Studios where he commissions documentaries. From 2003 to 2016 he was at Channel 4 Television, London, where he was Multiplatform and Online Video Commissioner (Factual). He is a specialist in multiplatform interactive projects around TV, commissioning factual and documentary interactive media, as well as short form and online video content. He was responsible for setting up Ideasfactory (renamed 4Talent), the Channel's creative industries talent development initiative. In 2014 he helped establish original Short Form Video on All 4, Channel 4's video on demand platform.

Gee was formerly Director of Production of pioneering broadband production company Redbus CPD. He began his career in 1983 at Solus Enterprises, the co-operative of cinematographers/film technicians Roger Deakins ASC BSC, Jack Hazan, Dick Pope BSC and David Mingay.

He has won over 90 international awards for his productions – including five British Academy Awards (BAFTA), an Emmy, three Royal Television Society (RTS) Awards, a Design Council Millennium Award and the Grand Award at the New York International Film & Television Festival.

Embarrassing Bodies Online won the Interactivity category of the TV BAFTAs in 2009. Both Lost Generation and Breaking the News were nominated for TV BAFTAs in 2006 and Big Art Mob was nominated for three TV BAFTAs in 2008. Empire's Children won the London Design Festival People's Choice (Y Design) Award in 2007. Big Art Mob won the RTS Innovation Award for mobile in 2007 and the Media Guardian Innovation Award for community engagement in 2008. Landshare won the RTS Innovation Award for user-generated content in 2009. Life Begins/One Born Every Minute was nominated for the New Media category of the TV BAFTAs in 2010 and Embarrassing Bodies: Live won the TV Craft BAFTA in 2010 for Interactive Creative Contribution. Big Fish Fight was nominated in 2011 for the TV Craft BAFTA for Digital Creativity and Live from the Clinic won the category in 2012; Live from the Clinic was nominated again in 2013 alongside The Great British Property Scandal. He has won several BIMA (British Interactive Media Assoc. Awards) including two in 2015 for Don’t Stop the Music made with international pianist James Rhodes and Jamie Oliver's Fresh One production company.

Missed Call won the TV BAFTA for best Short Programme in 2019. The documentary was shot entirely on an iPhone X. It was the first film made primarily for YouTube to win an academy award.

Take Me to Prom won the Canadian Screen Award for Best Short Documentary at the 8th Canadian Screen Awards in 2020.

Live from the Clinic won the International Digital Emmy for Non-Fiction in 2012 in Cannes. Embarrassing Bodies: Live was nominated for an International Digital Emmy in 2011 and The Great British Property Scandal was nominated in 2013. In 2015, Don't Stop the Music was nominated for the International Digital Emmy for Non-Fiction and Reverse the Odds won the International Digital Emmy for Children/Young People.

Gee has served on BAFTA's Television and Interactive Entertainment committees and is a voting member of the European Film Academy. He has served on the board of ICA's The Club at the Institute of Contemporary Arts and was a trustee of Culture24. Gee is a non-executive director of UK-based online marketing agency Hot Cherry and of Blue Door Creative Development. He was formerly a non-executive director of video dictionary Wordia with Michael Birch. Gee is a director/trustee of the Phoenix Cinema, the oldest purpose-built cinema in the UK.

Gee won the very first BAFTA Interactive Entertainment Award (with Tim Wright and Rob Bevan) which was for Comedy presented by Stephen Fry in 1998. This was for a CD-ROM game to do with creative thinking entitled 'MindGym'. He conceived the project, and co-wrote the script with interactive writer Tim Wright and writer/actor Ben Miller (Johnny English, etc.)

Gee served as an advisor on the UK government's Byron Review of Children and New Technology (child safety with regard to internet and video games) published in March 2008.

He was educated at the direct grant The Haberdashers' Aske's Boys' School in Elstree in Hertfordshire.

He was made a Freeman of the City of London through the Worshipful Company of Cutlers in 2006 and a Liveryman in 2009.

He worked as a volunteer on the London 2012 Olympic Games website/online media presence (for LOCOG) and on the London 2012 Paralympics site (for Channel 4).

Productions

Adam Gee's multiplatform/transmedia productions include:
 Bedtime Live
 Big Art Mob
 Big Art Project
 Big Fish Fight, a campaign led by Hugh Fearnley-Whittingstall
 Don't Stop the Music, a campaign with James Rhodes
 Embarrassing Bodies
 4thought.tv
 The Great British Property Scandal, a campaign led by George Clarke with Phil Spencer and Jon Snow
 Jamie's DreamSchool featuring Jamie Oliver
 Landshare
 Live from the Clinic, featuring Dr Christian Jessen and Dr Dawn Harper
 My Healthchecker
 One Born Every Minute
 Was It Something I Said? - with David Mitchell
 Quotables
 Sexperience, a sex education project
 The Sexperience 1000, a data visualiser
 Was It Something I Said
 Surgery Live, a collaboration with Wellcome Trust
 Osama Loves
 Empire's Children
 Picture This, a collaboration with Flickr
 Medicine Chest, a collaboration with Royal Botanic Gardens, Kew
 Breaking the News, a collaboration with ITN
 Lost Generation, a collaboration with the Imperial War Museum, London
 4mations - online hub for animation with Aardman Animations

Adam Gee's short form video projects as Executive Producer/Commissioner include:
 Brittle Bone Rapper
 Tattoo Twists
 The Black Lesbian Handbook
 My Secret Tattoo
 24 Hour Party Politics - with Bez of the Happy Mondays
 Futurgasm
 Drones in Forbidden Zones
 Circus Girls
 WTF is Cosplay?
 Body Mods
 L.A. Vice
 Naked & Invisible, with double world body painting champion Carolyn Roper
 Young & Minted: I Won the Lottery

Adam Gee's other documentary commissions/productions include:
 Vanished: The Surrey Schoolgirl - with Martin Bright
 Missed Call, the first documentary shot on an iPhone X
 Take Me to Prom
 Sorry I Shot You - with Stana, about restorative justice 
 Social Media Addicts Anonymous
 Travelling on Trash, about plastic pollution in the Mississippi river
 Absent from our Own Wedding, about proxy marriage in Montana
 In Your Face: Confronting tattoo prejudice
 Pure O, about an extreme form of OCD
 How to Save a Tribe: the women who rescued the Samaritans - with Leon McCarron
 Violet Vixen

External links
 Simple Pleasures part 4, Adam Gee's blog
 Adam Gee on IMDB
 Adam Gee on Twitter
 The Byron Review
 Hot Cherry

References

1963 births
Living people
Television people from London
Channel 4 people
Emmy Award winners
People educated at Haberdashers' Boys' School
Alumni of Girton College, Cambridge